Gopi Bhagat is an Indian cinematographer who primarily works in Bengali films. He collaborated with directors Kaushik Ganguly, Srijit Mukherji, Suman Mukhopadhyay, Nandita Roy and Shiboprosad Mukherjee, Churni Ganguly, Atanu Ghosh and Arun Roy. Some of his works include Egaro, Asamapto, Tarikh, Hiralal, 8/12 Binay Badal Dinesh and Kaberi Antardhan.

Filmography

References

External links 
 

Living people
Bengali film cinematographers
Year of birth missing (living people)
Place of birth missing (living people)